"All the Right Moves" is the lead single by American band OneRepublic from their second studio album Waking Up (2009). It was released to mainstream radio on September 24, 2009 and released for digital download on October 6, 2009. It is the band's first single of the album for all countries except Austria and Germany, where "Secrets" serves as the first single from the new album.

Frontman Ryan Tedder blogged on his Myspace page that before the song's release as a single the band had already performed it live on many occasions. He added, "however the recorded version is quite another animal than what we performed live—it's better, we hope you like it—this might be the most fun energetic song we've ever tackled."

A low quality version of the song was published by the band on September 3, 2009, while a higher quality version of the song can be found on their official Myspace page and official band website.
This song was used as the theme song for The CW's reality show, High Society.

Music video
On October 8, 2009, the official music video, directed by Wayne Isham, premiered on VH1.com and on MTV.com. The video features the band playing on a small stage for the attendees at a masquerade ball. As they perform the song, the dancers move in step with the music, while a small well-dressed urchin collects meager donations whilst pickpocketing the miserly dancers. Around the bridge of the song Ryan Tedder also plays the piano while singing into an antiquated chromed microphone. Although the song, the style and some of the instruments are more modern, the dancers' accouterments, the background props and the dance they perform is decidedly Edwardian. The band has explained that they like an abstract flavor in their music videos so as to allow for a broader range of interpretation.  The video peaked at number 4 on the VH1 Top 20 Video Countdown on April 4, 2010. The music video currently has 170.5 million views.

Critical reception
The song received generally positive reviews. Bill Lamb gave the song 4.5 stars and saying "Lyrically, the exact meaning and point of "All the Right Moves" is somewhat obscure, but the audio textures formed by the words fit perfectly into the sound of the record. The overall feel is of an air of sadness in not quite being able to achieve one's goals and aspirations with another. Regardless of whether you experience a depth of meaning, you are likely to be singing along."

Track listing
CD single
"All the Right Moves" – 3:59
"All the Right Moves" (Filthy Dukes remix) – 5:05

Charts and certifications

Weekly charts

Year-end charts

Certifications

Release history

References

2009 singles
OneRepublic songs
Songs written by Ryan Tedder
Music videos directed by Wayne Isham
Interscope Records singles
2009 songs
Song recordings produced by Ryan Tedder
Mosley Music Group singles